Matthew Green  (born September 10, 1980) is a Canadian politician who was elected to represent the riding of Hamilton Centre in the House of Commons of Canada in the 2019 Canadian federal election, and re-elected in 2021.

Early life 
Green grew up in Hamilton, and received a degree in political science from Acadia University. He later attended McMaster University in Hamilton.

Career 
First elected to the Hamilton City Council in 2014, he led the way for the city to become the first in Ontario to license and regulate payday lending. In 2018, he became the executive director of the Hamilton Centre for Civic Inclusion (HCCI), a non-profit organization that promotes racial equality.

Green has stated that the example set by Lincoln Alexander, the first Black Canadian MP, helped inspire him to get into politics. Green joined the NDP in 2017 after being inspired by Jagmeet Singh's stance against racial profiling.

Prior to his election to the House of Commons, he was the first Black Canadian to serve on the Hamilton City Council, where he represented Ward 3 from 2014 to 2018. Ideologically, Green identifies as a "Stanley Knowles New Democrat".

In 43rd Canadian Parliament
One of Green's claims to fame is that he is the first Black Canadian to represent Hamilton in parliament since Lincoln Alexander.

As a member of parliament, Green has been an outspoken opponent of police brutality, and has endorsed a nationwide ban on the use of tear gas.

In 44th Canadian Parliament
Green was re-elected on 20 September 2021 in the 2021 Canadian federal election to a Hung parliament, its 44th Canadian Parliament.

In an October 2021 interview with American socialist magazine Jacobin, Green endorsed a national wealth tax.

In March 2022 he was nominated by the leader of his party to serve on the Special Joint Committee on the Declaration of Emergency which had the mission to investigate the Freedom Convoy.

On the DECD Committee
Early on in the life of the DECD committee Green said that committee members "have a 'responsibility' to work together" in light of the disagreement of the Official Opposition over the constitution of the committee. It consisted of seven MPs and four senators. On 6 March 2022 co-chair Green was "interested in looking at the actions of police (or the lack of them), the role played by 'dark money' raised through" the GoFundMe and GiveSendGo crowdfunding platforms, even though the latter issue had been thoroughly debunked three days earlier when the FINA committee interviewed two executives from GoFundMe who testified that 86 per cent of the donors to the original GoFundMe campaign were Canadian, and 88 per cent of the donated funds to the original campaign were from Canadians.

Electoral record 

|- style="background-color:#fcfcfc;"
!rowspan="2" colspan="2" style="text-align:center;" |Candidate
!colspan="3" style="text-align:center;" |Popular vote
!rowspan="2" colspan="2" style="text-align:center;" |Expenditures
|- style="background-color:#fcfcfc;"
| style="text-align:center;" | Votes
| style="text-align:center;" |%
| style="text-align:center;" |±%
|-
| style="background-color:#7bbd55;" |
| style="text-align:left;" | Matthew Green
| style="text-align:right;" |2,852	
| style="text-align:right;" |40.72%
| style="text-align:right;" | –
| style="text-align:right;" |$31,380.20
|-
| style="background-color:#FF0000;" |
| style="text-align:left;" | Ralph Agostino
| style="text-align:right;" |1,229	
| style="text-align:right;" |17.55%
| style="text-align:right;" | –
| style="text-align:right;" |$22,900.91
|-
| style="background-color:#de292b;" |
| style="text-align:left;" | Drina Omazic
| style="text-align:right;" |825
| style="text-align:right;" |11.78%
| style="text-align:right;" | –
| style="text-align:right;" |$27,000.76
|-
| style="background-color:#ef8b42;" |
| style="text-align:left;" | Mark DiMillo
| style="text-align:right;" |525
| style="text-align:right;" |7.50%
| style="text-align:right;" |−2.63%
| style="text-align:right;" | n/a1
|-
| style="background-color:#ffffff;" |
| style="text-align:left;" | Sean Gibson
| style="text-align:right;" |361
| style="text-align:right;" |5.15%
| style="text-align:right;" |−8.53%
| style="text-align:right;" | n/a1
|-
| style="background-color:#f73e1e;" |
| style="text-align:left;" | Tim Simmons
| style="text-align:right;" |334
| style="text-align:right;" |4.77%
| style="text-align:right;" | –
| style="text-align:right;" | $15,087.14
|-
| style="background-color:#062955;" |
| style="text-align:left;" | Bob Assadourian
| style="text-align:right;" |330	
| style="text-align:right;" |4.71%
| style="text-align:right;" | –
| style="text-align:right;" | $26,412.29
|-
| style="background-color:#ffffff;" |
| style="text-align:left;" | Brian Kelly
| style="text-align:right;" |172
| style="text-align:right;" |2.46%
| style="text-align:right;" | –
| style="text-align:right;" | $5,670.73
|-
| style="background-color:#ffffff;" |
| style="text-align:left;" | Maria Anastasiou
| style="text-align:right;" |93
| style="text-align:right;" |1.33%
| style="text-align:right;" | –
| style="text-align:right;" | n/a1
|-
| style="background-color:#ffffff;" |
| style="text-align:left;" | Byron Wayne Millette
| style="text-align:right;" |73
| style="text-align:right;" |1.04%
| style="text-align:right;" | –
| style="text-align:right;" | n/a1
|-
| style="background-color:#ffffff;" |
| style="text-align:left;" | Eva John
| style="text-align:right;" |55
| style="text-align:right;" |0.79%
| style="text-align:right;" | –
| style="text-align:right;" | n/a1
|-
| style="background-color:#ffffff;" |
| style="text-align:left;" | Carlos Pinho
| style="text-align:right;" |51
| style="text-align:right;" |0.73%
| style="text-align:right;" | –
| style="text-align:right;" | n/a1
|-
| style="background-color:#ffffff;" |
| style="text-align:left;" | Victor Mejia
| style="text-align:right;" |42
| style="text-align:right;" |0.60%
| style="text-align:right;" | –
| style="text-align:right;" | n/a1
|-
| style="background-color:#ffffff;" |
| style="text-align:left;" | Bernie Szajkowski
| style="text-align:right;" |41	
| style="text-align:right;" |0.59%
| style="text-align:right;" | –
| style="text-align:right;" | $0
|-
| style="background-color:#ffffff;" |
| style="text-align:left;" | Jol Hess
| style="text-align:right;" |21
| style="text-align:right;" |0.30%
| style="text-align:right;" | –
| style="text-align:right;" | n/a1
|-
| style="text-align:right;background-color:#FFFFFF;" colspan="2" |Total votes
| style="text-align:right;background-color:#FFFFFF;" |7,113
| style="text-align:right;background-color:#FFFFFF;" |29.59%
| style="text-align:right;background-color:#FFFFFF;" |−1.41
| style="text-align:right;" |
|- 
| style="text-align:right;background-color:#FFFFFF;" colspan="2" |Registered voters
| style="text-align:right;background-color:#FFFFFF;" |24,035
| style="text-align:right;background-color:#FFFFFF;" |100%
| style="text-align:right;background-color:#FFFFFF;" |
| style="text-align:right;" |
|- 
| style="text-align:left;" colspan="6" |1 These candidates did not submit official Financial Statements and are, therefore, ineligible to run in the  2018 Municipal election  Note: All Hamilton Municipal Elections are officially non-partisan.  Note: Candidate campaign colours are based on the prominent colour used in campaign items (signs, literature, etc.)and are used as a visual differentiation between candidates.
|- 
| style="text-align:left;" colspan="13" |Sources: City of Hamilton, "Nominated Candidates"
|}

References

External links 
 

Living people
New Democratic Party MPs
Members of the House of Commons of Canada from Ontario
21st-century Canadian politicians
Hamilton, Ontario city councillors
Black Canadian politicians
1980 births
Canadian socialists